Oliver Lewis (1856–1924) was an American jockey in Thoroughbred horse racing. On May 17, 1875, Lewis won the very first Kentucky Derby aboard Aristides. The pair won by a reported two lengths, setting a new American record time for a mile-and-a-half race. Lewis and Aristides took second place in the Belmont Stakes, which is now the third race of the U.S. Triple Crown series. He is the great great grandfather of actor Rodney Van Johnson (Passions).

Lewis was born in Fayette County, Kentucky in 1856. After his death in 1924 he was buried in Benevolent Society No. 2 Cemetery, which is now known as African Cemetery No. 2.

On September 8, 2010 the Newtown Pike Extension in Lexington, Kentucky was named Oliver Lewis Way in honor of Lewis’s historic accomplishments.

References

American jockeys
African-American jockeys
1856 births
1924 deaths
People from Fayette County, Kentucky
20th-century African-American people